Promethium(III) chloride is a chemical compound of promethium and chlorine  with the formula PmCl3. It is an ionic, water soluble, crystalline salt that glows in the dark with a pale blue or green light due to promethium's intense radioactivity.

Applications
Promethium(III) chloride (with 147Pm) has been used to generate long-lasting glow in signal lights and buttons. This application relied on the unstable nature of promethium, which emitted beta radiation (electrons) with a half-life of several years. The electrons were absorbed by a phosphor, generating visible glow. Unlike many other radioactive nuclides, promethium-147 does not emit alpha particles that would degrade the phosphor.

References

Promethium compounds
Chlorides
Lanthanide halides